Vladimir Zuev may refer to:

Vladimir Zuev (physicist) (1925-2003), Russian physicist
Vladimir Zuyev (sailor) (born 1961), Belarusian sailor
Vladimir Zuev (figure skater) (born 1985), Ukrainian ice dancer